McDonald Brothers founded in 1878 was a Louisville-based firm of architects of courthouses and other public buildings.  It was a partnership of brothers Kenneth McDonald (died 1904), Harry McDonald (aka Henry P. McDonald), and Donald McDonald.

History 
Harry McDonald was the senior member of the firm.  He served in the American Civil War in the Confederate Army.  He was elected to the Kentucky legislature and died while in office in 1904.

Donald McDonald graduated from Washington and Lee University in 1873.

The McDonald Brothers partnership lasted from 1874 until 1896.  Kenneth McDonald practiced individually after then, until 1901.

The McDonald Brothers worked during 1896 on a redesign for the Thomas Jefferson-designed Rotunda at the University of Virginia, after it was destroyed by fire in 1895.  The McDonald Brothers were already at work in Charlottesville, designing Christ Episcopal Church.  For the Rotunda, they completed plans for "a new portico with cast-iron columns and a grand staircase" and also a somewhat controversial "elaborate two-story interior with multiple levels of cast-iron colonnades".  The firm was fired from the job, however, after it turned out "they miscalculated the structural stability of the ruined Rotunda." Stanford White, principal of McKim, Meade and White, was brought in to replace them.

Alfred Joseph, who later founded Joseph & Joseph architects in Louisville, worked for the McDonald Brothers before also working under McDonald and Sheblessy and McDonald and Dodd (with William J. Dodd).

Kenneth McDonald died in 1904.

Many of their works survive and are listed on the U.S. National Register of Historic Places.

Work
Works (with variations in attribution to both or either) include:
Adair County Courthouse, built 1885, 500 Public Sq., Columbia, Kentucky (McDonald Brothers), NRHP-listed
Adath Israel Temple, 834 S. 3rd St., Louisville, KY (McDonald Brothers), NRHP-listed
Aurora City Hall, 216 Third St. and 233-237 Main St., Aurora, IN (McDonald Bros.), NRHP-listed
One or more works in the Burlington Historic District, (Boundary Decrease, Boundary Increase), portions of Washington, Gallative, Perlate, Temperate, Garrard, Jefferson, Ohio Sts., Nicholas Ave, and Union Sq., Burlington, KY (McDonald Brothers, McCarvey Brothers), NRHP-listed
Casey County Courthouse, Courthouse Sq., Liberty, KY (McDonald Bros.), NRHP-listed
Carroll County Courthouse, Courthouse Sq., Carrollton, KY (H. P. McDonald, 1884),
Christ Episcopal Church (c.1896), Charlottesville, Virginia
Cumberland County Courthouse, Court House Sq., Toledo, IL (McDonald Brothers), NRHP-listed
First Cumberland Presbyterian Church-McKenzie, 305 N. Stonewall St., McKenzie, TN (McDonald Bros.), NRHP-listed
Gibson County Courthouse, Town Square, Princeton, IN (McDonald Brothers), NRHP-listed
Goodnight House, 201 S. Main St., Franklin, KY (McDonald Brothers), NRHP-listed
Henry County Courthouse, Jail, and Warden's House, Courthouse Sq., New Castle, KY (McDonald Brothers), NRHP-listed
Hickman County Courthouse, Court Sq., Clinton, KY (McDonald Brothers), NRHP-listed
Kentucky National Bank, 300 W. Main St., Louisville, KY (McDonald Brothers), NRHP-listed
Old Eddyville Historic District, Off KY 730, Eddyville, KY (McDonald Bros.), NRHP-listed
Old Jail, 103 Court St., Washington, GA (McDonald Brothers), NRHP-listed
Old Stone Jail, Courthouse Sq., Carrollton, KY (H.P. McDonald, 1880)
Sevier County Courthouse, Court Ave., Sevierville, TN (McDonald Brothers of Louisville), NRHP-listed
Simpson County Courthouse, KY 73, Franklin, KY (McDonald Brothers), NRHP-listed
Washington County Courthouse, Public Sq., Salem, IN (McDonald Bro.), NRHP-listed
Bartow County Courthouse, Courthouse Sq., Cartersville, GA (McDonald, Kenneth, & Co.), NRHP-listed
Lincliff, 6100 Longview Lane, Louisville, KY (McDonald, Kenneth), NRHP-listed
Muhlenberg County Courthouse, Courthouse Sq., Greenville, KY (McDonald, Kenneth, Sr.), NRHP-listed
Rossmore Apartment House, 664 River City Mall, Louisville, KY (McDonald, Kenneth), NRHP-listed
Calvary Episcopal Church, 821 S. 4th St., Louisville, KY (McDonald, Henry P.), NRHP-listed
Jail portion (designed 1874) of NRHP-listed Owen County Courthouse and Jail, N. Thomas and N. Madison Sts., Owenton, KY (McDonald, H.P.), NRHP-listed

McDonald and Dodd
Franklin Building at 658-660 South Fourth Avenue, Louisville
 Seelbach Hotel, 500 South Fourth Street, Louisville

Post-partnership
Jefferson County Courthouse Annex (1901), 517 Court Pl., Louisville, KY (McDonald, Kenneth, Sr.), NRHP-listed

References

Angus McDonald family of Virginia and West Virginia
Defunct architecture firms based in Kentucky
Defunct companies based in Louisville, Kentucky
American companies established in 1878